Charles Joseph Vopicka (born as Karel Boromejský Josef Vopička) (November 3, 1857 – September 4, 1935) was an American diplomat of Czech origin who served as United States Minister to Bulgaria, Romania, and Serbia.

Early life
He was born as Karel Boromejský Josef Vopička on 3 November 1857 at Dolní Hbity house 2, Příbram, Bohemia, Austrian Empire and baptized Catholic the next day. He was one of fourteen children. His father was a farmer and the mayor of their community.

By 1880, he had emigrated to live in Racine and Milwaukee, Wisconsin before moving to Chicago in 1881.

Career

He worked with his wife's brother Otto Kubin in the real estate and banking business until 1888. In the early 1900s, he became the President and Manager of Atlas Brewing Company of Chicago. He ran for Congress on the Democratic ticket in 1904 for the fifth district of Illinois but did not win.

On September 11, 1913, President Woodrow Wilson appointed Vopicka as United States Envoy Extraordinary and Minister Plenipotentiary to Romania, Serbia and Bulgaria. The outbreak of the Great War made his job all the more difficult.

Added to the delicate situation which was created by the daily snapping of diplomatic threads, there was imposed upon him the extra hazardous task of acting as Chairman of the International Commission in Serbia, where he was also representing the German and Austro-Hungarian interests. He was representing British interests in Bulgaria and German and Turkish interests in Romania. Representing nine nations in Bucharest, during the German occupation of that city, his life for four years was one of extraordinary activity and private and public strain. Acting for Germany and Turkey he handed their ultimatum to Romania. Likewise to him fell the task of persuading several hundred thousand Russians to remain in the trenches to fight the Central Powers to the bitter end. After the termination of hostilities and the consequent resumption of international amenities, Minister Vopicka conducted parleys for the various powers and has notably assisted in the task of building order out of chaos and destruction. In the spring of 1920, he resigned.

In 1917, Vopicka traveled to Berlin, after remaining in Bucharest after the removal of the Romanian Government to Jassy (whose withdrawal was requested by the German Government). Germany later withdrew the charges and Vopicka returned to Bucharest.

Later career
After his diplomatic career ended in 1920, he returned to Chicago where he was a member of the Board of Education from 1927 to 1930. A friend of Queen Marie of Romania, he was instrumental in bringing the Queen to Chicago when she visited the United States in 1926.  He also served as chairman of the board of the Atlas Brewing Company until his death in 1935.

Personal life

Together, they were the parents of six daughters, including:

 Victoria Vopicka, who married U.S. Representative William H. Stevenson.
 Elsie Vopicka, who married Edward Kralovec.
 Clara Vopicka, who married Jerome Schelsinger.
 Mildred Vopicka, who married Thomas J. Doyle.
 Helen Vopicka, who married Gordon William Dougherty.
 Harriet Vopicka, who married Raymond Hockmuth.

Vopicka died in Chicago on September 4, 1935 after attending the funeral of Anna Wilmarth Ickes, wife of Franklin D. Roosevelt's Cabinet member Harold L. Ickes.  After a funeral held at Pilsen Hall in Chicago, Vopicka was buried in the Bohemian National Cemetery.

Honors and legacy
In 1918, he was awarded the Grand Cross of the Star of Romania "as a recognition of his devotion to the allied cause and especially to Rumania during these trying times."  He also received the Grand Cordon of the White Eagle, First Class, from the Prince Regent of Serbia.

References

1857 births
1935 deaths
People from Příbram District
American company founders
Austro-Hungarian emigrants to the United States
People from Racine, Wisconsin
People from Milwaukee
People from Chicago
Ambassadors of the United States to Romania
Ambassadors of the United States to Serbia
Ambassadors of the United States to Bulgaria
Grand Crosses of the Order of the Star of Romania
Burials at Bohemian National Cemetery (Chicago)
Members of the Chicago Board of Education
American people of Czech descent